Enrique Irazoqui (5 July 1944 – 16 September 2020) was a Spanish professor of literature, computer chess expert and actor, best known for his role as Jesus Christ in the 1964 film The Gospel According to St. Matthew, directed by Pier Paolo Pasolini. He was 19 when he played the lead role in Pasolini's film and only had a small number of screen roles afterwards.

Irazoqui was born in Barcelona, the son of a Spanish father and an Italian Jewish mother. He received the Honorary Citizenship of the city of Matera, Italy, in 2011.

In 2002 he was the arbiter during the Brains in Bahrain chess match between world champion Vladimir Kramnik and the computer program Deep Fritz, which ended in a tie.

Roles
 Jesus Christ in The Gospel According to St. Matthew, 1964, Italy, directed by Pier Paolo Pasolini
Noche de vino tinto, 1966, Spain, directed by José María Nunes
Dante no es únicamente severo, 1966, Spain, directed by Jacinto Esteva and Joaquim Jordà
A la soledat, 2008, Spain, directed by José María Nunes
• St. John the Baptist in _Das Neue Evangelium. The New Gospel (2020), Italy. Directed by Milo Rau.

References

External links

2020 deaths
1944 births
Male film actors from Catalonia
Spanish male film actors
20th-century Spanish male actors
21st-century Spanish male actors
Jewish actors
Male actors from Barcelona
Spanish people of Italian descent
Chess arbiters